The 14th legislature of the French Fifth Republic was the French Parliament elected in the 2012 French legislative election.

Composition of the executive

Successive Presidents of the Republic
When the 14th legislature was installed, François Hollande had been President of the Republic for 36 days.

After a tumultuous first term, Hollande decided not to run for a second term. Emmanuel Macron succeeded him on 14 May 2017 following the presidential election of 2017.

Prime Ministers and successive governments
François Hollande first reappointed Jean-Marc Ayrault as Prime Minister on June 20, 2012, which composes a single government. Manuel Valls is then named on March 31, 2014, which consists of two governments. Bernard Cazeneuve succeeds him on December 6, 2016 and will remain head of a single government until the election of Emmanuel Macron to the presidency of the Republic.
The last government of the fourteenth legislature is that of Édouard Philippe, which is renewed following the parliamentary elections of June 2017.

Composition of the National Assembly

155 women were elected or reelected and make up 26.86% of French MPs:

125 women MPs from left-wing parties. 
29 women MPs from right-wing parties. 
1 women MP from the Front National party.

The oldest member of the National Assembly is François Scellier, from the Radical Party, linked to the larger UMP conservative grouping. He represents the 6th Constituency of Val d'Oise and was 76 years old at the beginning of the current parliamentary term.

The youngest member of the National Assembly is Marion Maréchal-Le Pen from the Front National, the MP for the 3rd Constituency of Vaucluse. She was 22 years old at the beginning of the current parliamentary term and was actually the youngest ever MP elected under the French Fifth Republic.

Changes in composition
Members of the National Assembly who join the government are required to give up their seats to their substitutes (suppléants) a month after their appointment, as stipulated in the constitution. Should ministers quit the government, they recover their seat in the National Assembly from their substitute a month after their resignation. By-elections are held in the event of the annulation of electoral results or vacancies caused by resignations (in most circumstances not those related to the death of a deputy, in which case the substitute takes the seat if possible), except within the year before legislative elections.

By-elections

Parliamentary Groups

Chairmen of committees of the National Assembly

References

French Parliament
National Assembly (France)
2010s in French politics